William Rotch Bullard Jr (June 4, 1926 – May 23, 1972) was an American archaeologist.

Biography 
He received an AB and a Ph.D from Harvard University

Work 
In the 1960s, William Bullard mapped San Estevan, a Mayan site located in Belize.

References

1926 births
American archaeologists
Harvard College alumni
American Mesoamericanists
Mesoamerican archaeologists
Mayanists
20th-century Mesoamericanists
1972 deaths
American expatriates in Belize
Harvard Graduate School of Arts and Sciences alumni